Ruslan Mikhailovich Mashchenko (born November 11, 1971 in Voronezh) is a retired hurdler and sprinter from Russia. He is best known for winning two silver medals at the European Athletics Championships during his career (1998 and 2002). Along with Aleksandr Ladeyshchikov, Boris Gorban, and Andrey Semyonov, he won a silver medal in the 4x400 m relay at the 2001 World Indoor Championships . He represented his native country in three consecutive Summer Olympics (1996, 2000 and 2004), and set his personal best (48.06 s) in the men's 400 metres hurdles on 13 June 1998 in Helsinki, Finland.

References

1971 births
Living people
Russian male hurdlers
Russian male sprinters
Olympic male hurdlers
Olympic male sprinters
Olympic athletes of Russia
Athletes (track and field) at the 1996 Summer Olympics
Athletes (track and field) at the 2000 Summer Olympics
Athletes (track and field) at the 2004 Summer Olympics
Universiade medalists in athletics (track and field)
Universiade silver medalists for Russia
Medalists at the 1997 Summer Universiade
World Athletics Championships athletes for Russia
World Athletics Indoor Championships medalists
European Athletics Indoor Championships winners
European Athletics Championships medalists
Russian Athletics Championships winners
Sportspeople from Voronezh
20th-century Russian people
21st-century Russian people